Wule Island is one of the islands in the Rossel Islands, of the Louisiade Archipelago, which itself is part of the Milne Bay Province of Papua New Guinea. It is located  westward of the main island.

Demographics
In 2014, the population was 100, spread across 2 villages. The main village is Wule, on the east coast.

The indigenous people speak the Yélî Dnye language, a language isolate.

References

Islands of Milne Bay Province
Louisiade Archipelago